Dylan John Gavin (born 16 January 2003) is an Irish footballer who plays as a striker for  club Charlton Athletic.

Career

Early career
Gavin started his schoolboy football days in Ireland, with Athlonetown club St Peters FC. At the age of 14, he moved to St Francis; both clubs playing in the Athlone district schoolboy/girls league. It was at this time Dylan was selected for the Athlone District Emerging Talent Programe (E.T.P.), this allowed for his selection into the Athlone Schoolboys Kennedy cup team.

Gavin was also a very talented Gealic football player and played his club football at Athlone GAA. Whilst playing Gaelic football with local secondary school The Marist Collage, Dylan went on to win a junior Leinster GAA schools title.

Coming to the end of his time at local school football. Dylan made his move to the Airtricity League of Ireland with Athlone Town In the 2016/17 season he went on to win the Airtricity League of Ireland title at under 15 against St Patrick's Athletic F.C. Gavin scored a rebound from the penalty spot to equalize at 1-1 and went on to score the winner in the last minute of the game earning himself Man of the match and a major junior title with Athlone Town FC. He was now developing a serious eye for the goal and proven to have great power and accuracy when it came to free-kicks.

Charlton Athletic
Gavin was capped for the Republic of Ireland national football team under 16s but great interest in the young man came in from London side Charlton Athletic.

Due to strong interest in what Charlton Athletic had to offer. Dylan departed Athlone Town for a two-year scholarship with Charlton. Throughout his early days he made a very good impression and with his great vision, strength and proven scoring ability he became a regular name on the score sheet for the club at youth level. In 2021, Dylan was offered his first Professional contract with the Charlton Athletic Academy professional player development.

He made his debut for Charlton Athletic on 10 November 2020 in a 3–1 EFL Trophy victory over Leyton Orient coming on as a second-half substitute.

Billericay Town (loan)
On 21 January 2022, Gavin joined non-league Billericay Town on a one month loan.

On 22 February 2022, it was confirmed that Gavin's loan had been extended for a further month.

On 24 March 2022, it was confirmed that Gavin's loan had been extended until the end of the season.

On 12 April 2022, Gavin scored the winning goal for Billericay Town in the Essex Senior Cup final giving his side a 1-0 victory over Bowers & Pitsea.

Tonbridge Angels (loan)
On 19 August 2022, Gavin joined his second non-league side, Tonbridge Angels, until January 2023.

Welling United (loan)
On 14 January 2023, Gavin joined his third non-league side by signing for Welling United until 11 February 2023.

Dulwich Hamlet (loan)
On 21 February 2023, Gavin joined his fourth non-league side by signing for Dulwich Hamlet until 20 March 2023.

Career statistics

Honours

Billericay Town
Essex Senior Cup: 2021–22

References
 
● https://www.westmeathindependent.ie/2021/02/07/i-just-wanted-to-go-over-and-follow-my-dream }
● https://www.independent.ie/sport/soccer/league-of-ireland/jubilant-scenes-as-athlone-strike-late-to-win-inaugural-under-15-title-36353242 }
● http://athlonegaaclub.com
● https://www.stfrancisfc.ie
● http://www.soccer-ireland.com/westmeath-football-clubs/st-peters-fc

External links
 

2000 births
Living people
Republic of Ireland association footballers
Association football forwards
Charlton Athletic F.C. players
Billericay Town F.C. players
Tonbridge Angels F.C. players
Welling United F.C. players
Dulwich Hamlet F.C. players
People from Athlone
English Football League players
National League (English football) players